The Charles T. Terrell Unit is a Texas Department of Criminal Justice prison located in unincorporated Brazoria County, Texas, with a Rosharon, Texas postal address; it is not inside the Rosharon census-designated place.

History
The prison opened in September 1983. The Terrell Unit was originally the Ramsey III Unit. After the previous Terrell Unit (now the Polunsky Unit) in West Livingston, Texas began to receive death row inmates, the facility's namesake, a Dallas insurance executive named Charles Terrell, wanted his name off of the prison; as a result his name was transferred to another prison. The Texas Board of Criminal Justice voted to rename the Ramsey III Unit on July 20, 2001.

In 2008 a state investigation began in regards to accusations that a cabal of prison guards is organizing large scale smuggling of goods into the unit. A prison guard at the unit sent a complaint to Jerry Madden, a member of the Texas House of Representatives, saying that corruption was occurring at the unit. TDCJ investigators searched the entire unit. After the investigation on the matter, Anthony Collins, the senior warden, lost his job. TDCJ investigators searched the entire prison to find evidence of corruption. The Texas Senate ordered prison officials to testify in a hearing related to the incident.

Notable prisoners
Former:
 David Owen Brooks (1975-2020)
 Pimp C (2002-2005)

References

12) http://www.kwtx.com/content/news/Third-Texas-prison-unit-evacuated-because-of-Brazos-River-flooding-381784271.html

External links

 "Terrell Unit." Texas Department of Criminal Justice.
 Map of Terrell Unit: Texas Tribune

Prisons in Brazoria County, Texas
1983 establishments in Texas